Wolfsbane is a BBC Books original novel written by Jacqueline Rayner and based on the long-running British science fiction television series Doctor Who. It features both the Fourth and Eighth Doctors, Sarah Jane, and Harry, although the two Doctors never meet- their sequences taking place a month apart as the Eighth tackles the main crisis with Harry while the Fourth and Sarah tie up the loose ends a month later when they attempt to return to pick Harry up- and with nobody ever realising that the Doctors are the same person due to the Eighth's current amnesia.

This novel is part of the story arc of companions being taken out of time, which is resolved in Sometime Never....

The Eighth Doctor's appearance is during the time when he is amnesiac and stranded on Earth for a hundred years.

See also
Werewolf (Doctor Who)

References

External links
The Cloister Library - Wolfsbane

2003 British novels
2003 science fiction novels
Past Doctor Adventures
Fourth Doctor novels
Eighth Doctor novels
Doctor Who multi-Doctor stories
Novels by Jacqueline Rayner